Sydney Barta (born February 16, 2004) is an American track and field athlete. An amputee, she competed in the 100 metres and 200 metres in the 2020 Tokyo Paralympic Games. In 2019, she was awarded US Paralympics Track and Field Female High School Athlete of the Year.

Biography 
Barta was born and grew up in Arlington, VA, USA. Her mother, Laura, played basketball for Princeton University in New Jersey, USA. When Barta was 6 years she was finishing a fun run the 2010 Marine Corps Marathon when metal scaffolding fell onto her, shattering her left ankle. She spent the next four months in hospital and, while being treated for her injury, she developed compartment syndrome. Her wound became infected leading to a portion of her left leg being removed over the course of 21 surgeries. She was eight years old when she competed in her first track and field fixture in Fort Wayne. Barta competed in seven events and swam the 200m freestyle swimming over the course of two days. At the event, Barta met the head of the Challenged Athletes Foundation which resulted in the organization donating an improved running blade to her.

Barta won gold in the 100, 200 and 400 metres at the 2019 World Para Athletics Junior Championships in Switzerland and her performance in this championship landed her a place in the Parapan American Games in Lima, Peru where she won gold in the 100 metres. Barta competed in the World Para Athletics Championships in 2019 where she entered three events finishing 7th in the shot put T64, 4th in the 200 metres T64 and 9th in the discus throw T64. In the 2020 Paralympic Games, Barta qualified for the 200 metres final where she narrowly missed out on a medal, finishing 4th behind Kimberly Alkemade of the Netherlands.

References 

2004 births
Paralympic track and field athletes of the United States
Living people
Athletes (track and field) at the 2020 Summer Paralympics
American amputees